The Infiniti Q60 is a 2-door sport luxury coupe manufactured by Japanese automaker Infiniti. It is the successor to the Infiniti G coupe and convertible. The Q60 nameplate was first used as a rebranding of Infiniti G coupes. A new version was introduced in early 2016, as a 2017 model.

First generation (2013; V36) 

The first-generation Infiniti Q60 was based on the fourth generation (V36) G Coupe.  This came about when Infiniti former president Johan de Nysschen cited the need for "a new identity and direction to promote consumer familiarity with our model range as we expand the portfolio." Beginning in 2014, all passenger cars would be "Q" followed by a two-digit number. Those numbers would correspond to the vehicle’s position in the Infiniti hierarchy.

Second generation (2016; V37) 

The second-generation Infiniti Q60 was unveiled at the 2015 North American International Auto Show as a concept. A year later, Infiniti unveiled the production version at the 2016 North American International Auto Show, followed by the European version debuting at the 2016 Geneva Motor Show.

The vehicles went on sale in the end of 2016 as models for 2017. Early models included 2.0t, 3.0t (304/405PS).

American models went on sale as model year vehicles for 2017. Early models included 2.0t, 2.0t AWD, 3.0t (304PS), 3.0t AWD (304PS) in August 2016; followed by Red Sport 400 and Red Sport 400 AWD later in September 2016. 3.0t Sport and 3.0t Sport AWD went on sale in December 2016. Europe models were set to go on sale in October 2016 as a model year for 2017. Early models included 2.0t, followed by 3.0t (405PS).

The 2017 Q60 received many major upgrades like a lower and wider body, introduction of second generation Direct Adaptive Steering, Drive Mode Selector with custom settings profile, hydraulic electronic rack and pinion power steering system standard (2.0t), introduction of Dynamic Digital Suspension, retuned seven speed automatic transmission, Active Grille Shutter in V6 engine models, and for the first time, all new turbocharged engines. The Q60 Convertible was discontinued for the second generation.

Following the redesign, the new Q60 is able to have a drag coefficient of just 0.28, and zero front and rear lift. This allows the vehicle to remain stable at high speeds and in crosswind conditions. This is due to the all-new Active Grille Shutters, which help balance the engine's cooling requirements while also enhancing aerodynamics. The grille shutters remains closed under normal use, and open up when greater performance is required.

The Q60 is available in several trims: Pure, Luxe, Sport and Red Sport 400.

The only engine choice for the Pure and Luxe trims is the Mercedes-Benz sourced 2.0L turbocharged engine(Not true at least since 2019 as current Pure and Luxe Q60 comes with a 3.0L Turbo Charged engine.), while the Sport and Red Sport receive the all new 3.0L turbocharged Nissan VR engine. The engine is the same for both the Sport and Red Sport trims, however, the Red Sport model is tuned to make . The Sport trim's output is 300hp and. All engines are mated to a 7-speed automatic, and the 3.0t is also equipped with dual automatic transmission coolers. The 6-speed manual was dropped for the second generation.

Q60 Red Sport 400 is based on Q60 3.0t (304PS) coupe. Features include 14" rotors on the front and 13.8" rotors on the rear, opposed 2 and 4 piston red calipers, sport tuned Digital Dynamic Suspension, semi aniline leather appointed sport seats, aluminium accented pedals and paddle shifters, unique dual brushed satin finish Red Sport 400 exhaust tips, exclusive 20 inch sport aluminium-alloy wheels (staggered for RWD models) and chrome finished red 'S' exterior sport badging on the trunk and front fenders.

The Q60 also offers slew of new technologies and safety features. For 2018 model year, the ProAssist Package consisted of: Predictive Forward Collision Warning, Forward Emergency Braking with Pedestrian Detection, Blind Spot Warning, Around View® Monitor with Moving Object Detection, Front & Rear Parking Sensors, Rain Sensing Wipers and Backup Collision Intervention® with Rear Cross Traffic Alert. The ProActive Package adds: Intelligent Cruise Control with Full Speed Range, Lane Departure Warning and Lane Departure Prevention with Active Lane Control, Blind Spot Intervention, Distance Control Assist, Advanced Climate Control System with Plasmacluster and Grape Polyphenol filter, auto leveling Adaptive Front Lighting System with High Beam Assist, front seat pre-crash seatbelts and Direct Adaptive Steering.

Neiman Marcus Edition 
For 2017, Infiniti offered the Q60 Neiman Marcus Edition, limited to 50 units and based on the Infiniti Q60 Red Sport 400, for the United States.  If featured Solar Mica (golden beige) body color, carbon fiber mirror housings, a rear spoiler, white semi-aniline leather interior, brushed aluminum trim, a custom AUTODROMO weekender bag, a personalized plaque in a special compartment that features the car's VIN, and a Premium Coverking car cover with Neiman Marcus graphics.

The vehicle went on sale on February 11, 2017.

Project Black S 

The Project Black S is a concept Q60 developed with Renault Sport Formula One Team. It was unveiled at the 2017 Geneva International Motor Show. It features a Formula One inspired energy regeneration system with a dual motor/generator unit and battery pack. Engine power specifications were not disclosed, however, it is expected to come with the Red Sport 400 engine. The first motor traction motor/generator mounts is attached end of transmission, providing direct power to the rear wheels. The second motor/generator is attached to the turbocharger, to help spool it up instantly to eliminate turbo lag at lower engine speeds. Once at higher revs, when the exhaust is flowing through the turbine and no longer has lag, it acts as a generator by siphoning off a bit of electricity and sending it to the battery. It is estimated to have an output of 500 hp with the V6 engine and two electric motors. It will also feature braking-by-wire, but will ditch the Red Sport’s controversial steering-by-wire system in favour of a motor-driven unit.

The vehicle also features a center-mounted titanium twin exhaust system and lightweight 21-inch forged wheels all mounted on 245/35R21 Pirelli P Zero. It also features a new racing inspired vents up front framing the front bumper, and a rear diffuser and wing, aimed to significantly increase rear downforce of the car.

In an interview conducted by Car Advice, Infiniti’s director of product strategy and motorsport, Tommaso Volpe, revealed that the countdown to the prototype's unveiling was on. He mentioned that several key suppliers were just weeks away from delivering important components like electric motors, as well as other key parts for the twin turbo V6 engine. An updated version of Project Black S was unveiled at the 2018 Paris Motor Show. It features new yellow accents on the front bumper, tires and spoiler, new wheels and a revised hood. Infiniti was expected to release more details about the engine at the Paris Motor Show as well. However, Infiniti confirmed in March, 2021 that the project has been canceled.

Engines

Production 
Production of the Infiniti Q60 coupé began in Nissan's manufacturing facility in Tochigi, Japan., for export only. In 2019, Infiniti was testing some of its current models at the Spaceport America desert test tracks, such as its Q50 sports sedan and Q60 sports coupe.

Sales and marketing 
Kit Harington was featured in an Infiniti Q60 short film titled Tyger. According to an interview conducted by I4U News, Allyson Witherspoon, the director of marketing communications and media at Infiniti USA, said "The Kit Harington film is just the first piece of an completely integrated marketing campaign for the all-new Q60 that includes key strategic partnerships including media partners and influencers." In February 2017, Infiniti delivered bouquets of flowers to the doors of other Infiniti owners in a Q60 in Europe.

References

External links 
USA official website
Press kit:
2014 Q60: USA Convetrible, USA Coupe, USA IPL Convertible, USA IPL Coupe
2017 Q60: New Infiniti Q60 sports coupe: designed and engineered to perform

Q60
All-wheel-drive vehicles
Rear-wheel-drive vehicles
Coupés
Cars introduced in 2013
Cars introduced in 2016
Compact executive cars